is a Japanese engineer, professor, and writer. Since 1994 he has been a professor at Doshisha University, where he oversees the Intelligent System Design Laboratory (ISDL). He received his graduate degree from Osaka University in 1978. In addition to his academic research on parallel computing and intelligent systems, he has written opinion columns for Sankei Shimbun on education, technology, and employment.

References

External links

 Intelligent System Design Laboratory
 Doshisha University

1950 births
Living people
Japanese computer scientists